The 2020 Arizona wildfire season was a series of wildfires that burned across the state of Arizona. The season is a part of the 2020 Western United States wildfire season. With 2,520 fires burning  of land, it was the largest wildfire season in Arizona since 2011.  Wildfires occur year-round in the state but are most numerous and typically burn the largest swaths of land during spring and summer. Peak fire season in the Southwest typically runs from May, when conditions are windy, hot, and dry, through mid-July, when the North American Monsoon provides the region with precipitation to slow fire activity.

By the end of the year, more than fifty fires larger than  had burned within the state. However, the most notable fire of the season, the Ocotillo Fire, burned only  over four days and threatened the town of Cave Creek. It destroyed 20 buildings, including 8 homes.

Early outlook
In April, the Arizona Department of Forestry and Fire Management expected a "potentially active" fire season reminiscent of the 2019 season. Increased grass load from a wet winter is expected to contribute to an elevated risk of fire in the Central Arizona deserts. Southwest Coordination Center Predictive Services forecasted an Above Normal risk for significant wildland fires from May through July for most of Arizona (excepting the Colorado Plateau), with fire potential returning to Normal by August with the arrival of a climatologically average monsoon. They cited above normal fine fuel loading in southern Arizona deserts and an active weather pattern through mid-June to support this risk. A fire department helicopter crashed while bringing supplies to firefighters, killing the pilot.

List of wildfires

See also
 List of Arizona wildfires

References

External links

 Arizona Interagency Wildfire Prevention – Wildfire News
 Southwest Coordination Center (SWCC)

 
Arizona, 2020